Ricardo André de Pinho Sousa (born 11 January 1979) is a Portuguese football manager and former player who played as an attacking midfielder.

He amassed Primeira Liga totals of 154 matches and 47 goals over seven seasons, representing in the competition Porto, Beira-Mar, Santa Clara, Belenenses and Boavista. He scored the only goal of the 1999 Taça de Portugal final  for Beira-Mar, and also competed professionally in Germany, the Netherlands, Cyprus and Slovenia.

Sousa began coaching in 2015, leading clubs including Beira-Mar and taking Mafra to the cup semi-finals in 2022.

Playing career

Club
Sousa was born in São João da Madeira. Growing up as a footballer in FC Porto, he would play only three games for its first team – a 0–0 Primeira Liga draw against C.D. Santa Clara and two UEFA Champions League appearances, twice as a substitute – and went on to represent S.C. Beira-Mar, where he made his top-division debut in the second part of the 1998–99 season, Santa Clara and C.F. Os Belenenses in consecutive loans; on 16 June 1999, he scored arguably the most important goal of his career as the Aveiro club defeated S.C. Campomaiorense 1–0 to win the Taça de Portugal.

Sousa was finally released by Porto in July 2002, returning to Beira-Mar and representing Boavista F.C. in the following campaign. He netted 14 times for a team that only achieved 32, one of the worst records in that year's top flight.

Subsequently, Sousa left Boavista, signing for three years with German club Hannover 96, during which time he spent the second half of the 2004–05 on loan to De Graafschap of the Dutch Eredivisie and the whole of the 2006–07 season in the Portuguese top tier with Boavista, also on loan.

In summer 2007, Sousa joined Cypriot First Division's AC Omonia. The following January, he returned to Germany and joined 2. Bundesliga side Kickers Offenbach, starting in all 16 appearances he made and providing five assists in an eventual relegation.

Sousa split the 2008–09 campaign in Segunda Liga, starting with Beira-Mar and signing for U.D. Leiria in January 2009. After contributing only four matches and 138 minutes to the latter's return to the he division, he moved abroad again, now with NK Drava Ptuj in Slovenia. In July 2010, he returned to Portugal's division two with U.D. Oliveirense, before ending his playing career in the lower leagues with SC São João de Ver and G.D. Gafanha.

International
Sousa represented Portugal at the 1999 FIFA World Youth Championship, scoring once against South Korea and playing all four matches.

Coaching career
Sousa began coaching in the third tier with A.D. Sanjoanense in 2015; he had left his hometown club as a teenager 18 years earlier. In August 2016, he was hired for one season at Lusitano F.C. in the same league. During his year in Vila Real de Santo António, they won the Algarve Football Association Cup with a 2–1 victory over C.D.R. Quarteirense.

In June 2017, Sousa returned to his home district by joining Anadia FC, leaving at the turn of the year due to a "new project". This turned out to be at F.C. Felgueiras 1932, where he succeeded Horácio Gonçalves at the fifth-placed side. After play-off elimination by S.C. Farense, he signed a new contract in May.

Sousa returned to Beira-Mar in June 2019, with the club having just been promoted from the Aveiro Football Association's district leagues. He left by mutual accord 18 months later, as they eventually went back down.

On 16 April 2021, Sousa was hired in his first professional managerial post, taking over at tenth-placed C.D. Mafra in the second division after the resignation of Filipe Cândido. He debuted two days later in a goalless draw at Oliveirense. In his first full season, he guided his team to the quarter-finals of the national cup for the first time, with a 3–1 home defeat of top-flight Moreirense F.C. with one man fewer. In the next round, they ousted Portimonense S.C. of the same tier with a 4–2 away win.

Personal life
Sousa was the son of another footballer – and midfielder – António Sousa, who played club football in the 1980s for Porto and Sporting CP, also being a mainstay with the national team during that decade. After retiring, he went on to have a lengthy spell in management, coaching Ricardo at Beira-Mar in four different stints (1998–99, 2000–01, 2002–03 and 2008).

His son Afonso was also involved in the sport, and they were also related to fellow footballer José Sousa.

References

External links

1979 births
Living people
People from São João da Madeira
Sportspeople from Aveiro District
Portuguese footballers
Association football midfielders
Primeira Liga players
Liga Portugal 2 players
Segunda Divisão players
A.D. Sanjoanense players
FC Porto players
S.C. Beira-Mar players
C.D. Santa Clara players
FC Porto B players
C.F. Os Belenenses players
Boavista F.C. players
U.D. Leiria players
U.D. Oliveirense players
SC São João de Ver players
G.D. Gafanha players
Bundesliga players
2. Bundesliga players
Hannover 96 players
Kickers Offenbach players
Eredivisie players
De Graafschap players
Cypriot First Division players
AC Omonia players
Slovenian PrvaLiga players
NK Drava Ptuj players
Portugal youth international footballers
Portugal under-21 international footballers
Portuguese expatriate footballers
Expatriate footballers in Germany
Expatriate footballers in the Netherlands
Expatriate footballers in Cyprus
Expatriate footballers in Slovenia
Portuguese expatriate sportspeople in Germany
Portuguese expatriate sportspeople in the Netherlands
Portuguese expatriate sportspeople in Cyprus
Portuguese expatriate sportspeople in Slovenia
Portuguese football managers
Liga Portugal 2 managers
S.C. Beira-Mar managers